The 1990 Philips Open was a men's tennis tournament played on outdoor clay courts at the Nice Lawn Tennis Club in Nice, France, and was part of the World Series of the 1990 ATP Tour. It was the 19th edition of the tournament and took place from 16 April through 22 April 1990. Unseeded Juan Aguilera won the singles title.

Finals

Singles

 Juan Aguilera defeated  Guy Forget 2–6, 6–3, 6–4
 It was Aguilera's 1st singles title of the year and the 4th of his career.

Doubles

 Alberto Mancini /  Yannick Noah defeated  Marcelo Filippini /  Horst Skoff 6–4, 7–6

References

External links
 ITF tournament edition details

Philips Open
1990
Philips Open
Philips Open
20th century in Nice